Strictly Come Dancing returned for its twelfth series beginning from 7 September 2014 with a launch show, with the live shows starting on 26 and 27 September. Tess Daly returned to present the main show on BBC One alongside Claudia Winkleman, who was promoted to co-presenter in addition to the results show after Sir Bruce Forsyth decided to leave the show (He made his final regular appearance on this series' launch show) after the eleventh series; however, Forsyth continued to host the Christmas and Children in Need specials. Zoe Ball returned as presenter of spin-off show Strictly Come Dancing: It Takes Two on BBC Two. Judges Len Goodman, Bruno Tonioli, Craig Revel Horwood and Darcey Bussell also returned.

In the third week entertainer Donny Osmond joined the four regular judges, making the maximum score that week 50 points. The shows from 1 to 16 November were hosted by Daly and Zoe Ball, after one of Winkleman's children was involved in an accident. Winkleman returned to co-host the show on 22 November.

The series was won by Caroline Flack and Pasha Kovalev on 20 December. She became the first celebrity to score the maximum 40 from the judges in all three of her dances in the final, and second to get the highest scores possible in the final after Lisa Snowdon did in series 6, and also set the record for the longest consecutive run of 40 marks, with four, since her second dance in the semi-final had also scored 40, breaking Snowdon's record of three. Kovalev also became the second strictly professional to reach the finals three times, after Brendan Cole.

Couples
On 1 June 2014, it was revealed that James Jordan, Artem Chigvintsev (who took a break to appear on Dancing with the Stars) and Anya Garnis would not be returning as professionals, but that Garnis would still be part of the choreography team. They would instead be replaced by two new professionals, Joanne Clifton and Tristan MacManus, who had previously appeared on Dancing With the Stars, in addition to Natalie Lowe who would return after withdrawing from the last series due to a foot injury. On 6 August, it was announced that Robin Windsor would not be competing as a professional in the series as previously announced, due to back injury. He was replaced by Trent Whiddon.

Frankie Bridge was announced as the first contestant on 13 August, with more celebrities being announced throughout the month. The full line-up was revealed by the BBC on 29 August.

Scoring chart

Average chart
This table only counts for dances scored on a traditional 40-points scale (the scores from the Waltz-a-Thon in week eleven are not included and the scores from week 3 are weighted to work on the same scale).

Highest and lowest scoring performances of the series
The highest and lowest performances in each dance according to the judges' scale are as follows (scores given by guest judges are deducted from the total).

Couples' highest and lowest scoring dances

Weekly scores and songs
Unless indicated otherwise, individual judges scores in the charts below (given in parentheses) are listed in this order from left to right: Craig Revel Horwood, Darcey Bussell, Len Goodman, Bruno Tonioli.

Launch show
Musical guests: 5 Seconds of Summer—"Amnesia" and Smokey Robinson & Imelda May—"Get Ready"

Week 1
 Running order (Night 1 – Friday)

Running order (Night 2 – Saturday)

Week 2
Musical guests: Jamie Cullum and Gregory Porter—"Don't Let Me Be Misunderstood"
 Running order

Judges' votes to save
 Horwood: Jennifer & Tristan
 Bussell: Jennifer & Tristan
 Tonioli: Jennifer & Tristan
 Goodman: Did not vote, but would have voted to save Jennifer & Tristan

Week 3: Movie Week

Individual judges scores given in the chart below (given in parentheses) are listed in this order from left to right: Craig Revel Horwood, Darcey Bussell, Donny Osmond, Len Goodman, Bruno Tonioli.

Musical guest: Donny Osmond—"Moon River"
Running order

Judges' votes to save
 Horwood: Simon & Kristina
 Bussell: Simon & Kristina
 Osmond: Simon & Kristina
 Tonioli: Did not vote, but would have voted to save Simon & Kristina
 Goodman: Did not vote, but would have voted to save Simon & Kristina

Week 4

Musical guests: Lady Gaga and Tony Bennett—"Anything Goes"/"It Don't Mean a Thing (If It Ain't Got That Swing)"
Running order

Judges' votes to save
 Horwood: Mark & Karen
 Bussell: Mark & Karen
 Tonioli: Mark & Karen
 Goodman: Did not vote, but would have voted to save Mark and Karen.

Week 5

Musical guest: Culture Club—"Karma Chameleon"
Running order

Judges' votes to save

Horwood: Thom & Iveta
Bussell: Thom & Iveta
Tonioli: Simon & Kristina
Goodman: Simon & Kristina

Week 6: Halloween Week

Musical guest: Annie Lennox—"I Put a Spell on You"
Running order

Judges' votes to save

Horwood: Alison & Aljaž
Bussell: Alison & Aljaž
Tonioli: Alison & Aljaž
Goodman: Did not vote, but would have voted to save Scott & Joanne

Week 7

Musical guest: Katherine Jenkins—"We'll Gather Lilacs"
Running order

Judges' votes to save

Horwood: Caroline & Pasha
Bussell: Caroline & Pasha
Tonioli: Caroline & Pasha
Goodman: Did not vote, but would have voted to save Caroline & Pasha

Week 8: Blackpool Week

Musical guests: Shirley Bassey—"Goldfinger" and McBusted—"Air Guitar"
Running order

Judges' votes to save

Horwood: Sunetra & Brendan
Bussell: Sunetra & Brendan
Tonioli: Sunetra & Brendan
Goodman: Did not vote, but would have voted to save Sunetra & Brendan

Week 9

Musical guest: Barry Manilow—"Copacabana"/"What a Wonderful World"

Running order

Judges' votes to save

Horwood: Sunetra & Brendan
Bussell: Steve & Ola
Tonioli: Sunetra & Brendan
Goodman: Sunetra & Brendan

Week 10: "Around the World" Week
Musical guests: André Rieu and Alfie Boe—"Volare"
Dance guests: Michael Flatley & Lord of the Dance

Running order

Judges' votes to save

Horwood: Mark & Karen
Bussell: Mark & Karen
Tonioli: Mark & Karen
Goodman: Did not vote, but would have voted to save Mark & Karen

Week 11: Quarter-Final
Musical guest: OneRepublic—"Counting Stars"
Running order

Judges' votes to save
Horwood: Pixie & Trent
Bussell: Simon & Kristina
Tonioli: Pixie & Trent
Goodman: Simon & Kristina

Week 12: Semi-Final
Musical guest: Paloma Faith—"Changing"

Running order

For the Dance Off, Jake & Janette chose to dance their Cha-Cha-Cha, while Mark & Karen chose to dance their Rumba.

Judges votes to save
Horwood: Mark & Karen
Bussell: Jake & Janette
Tonioli: Jake & Janette
Goodman: Mark & Karen

Week 13: Final
Musical guest: Take That—"Greatest Day"/"These Days"/"Never Forget"
Running order (Show 1)

Running order (Show 2)

Dance chart

 Highest scoring dance
 Lowest scoring dance

Week 1: Cha-Cha-Cha, Jive, Tango or Waltz
Week 2: One unlearned dance (introducing American Smooth, Charleston, Foxtrot and Salsa)
Week 3 (Movie Week): One unlearned dance (introducing Paso Doble, Quickstep, Rumba and Samba)
Week 4: One unlearned dance
Week 5: One unlearned dance (introducing Viennese Waltz)
Week 6 (Halloween Week): One unlearned dance
Week 7: One unlearned dance
Week 8 (Blackpool Week): One unlearned dance (introducing Argentine Tango)
Week 9: One unlearned dance
Week 10 ("Around the World" Week): One unlearned dance
Week 11: One unlearned dance and Waltz-a-Thon
Week 12: Two unlearned dances
Week 13 (Show 1): Judges' choice and showdance
Week 13 (Show 2): Couple's favourite dance of the series

Reception
The series was received positively by both critics and viewing figures. It regularly came first, beating out rival show The X Factor.

Osmond's role as a judge in week three was panned by viewers, as he (unlike the other judges) was not a professional dancer. Viewers also deemed his scoring too inconsistent, as he awarded unusually high marks, including the first ten of the series.

Ratings
Weekly ratings for each show on BBC One. All numbers are in millions and provided by BARB.

References

External links
Official website

2014 British television seasons
Series 12
2014 in British television